The Graduate Providence is an upscale hotel that opened in 1922 as the Providence Biltmore Hotel, part of the Bowman-Biltmore Hotels chain. It is located on the southern corner of Kennedy Plaza at 11 Dorrance Street in downtown Providence, Rhode Island. It was added to the National Register of Historic Places in 1977 and is a member of Historic Hotels of America, the official program of the National Trust for Historic Preservation.

History

Early history
The Providence Biltmore was conceptualized by the civic spirit of the Providence Chamber of Commerce and funded through a public fundraising campaign in which 1,800 city denizens contributed to pay for the construction costs. The management of the hotel was awarded to the Bowman-Biltmore Hotels chain, founded by John McEntee Bowman and Louis Wallick. It was built in the neo-Federal Beaux-arts style and designed by the architectural firm of Warren and Wetmore, who also designed Grand Central Terminal. The hotel opened to much fanfare on June 6, 1922, and was the second-tallest building in the city after the Rhode Island State House, until the Industrial Trust Tower was finished six years later.<ref>Woodward, Wm McKenzie.  Guide to Providence Architecture.  1st ed.  United States: 2003. . p. 99.</ref> Today, the Biltmore is the 9th-tallest building in the city.

The Biltmore was the city’s only luxury hotel and welcomed many famous (and infamous) guests over the course of the 20th century. Mobsters, bootleggers, celebrities and politicians frequented the hotel and its many restaurants and bars. The hotel was the backdrop for many Rhode Island political and social scandals over the years, many of which are documented in the books”Meet Me At The Biltmore” (published in 2022 by Stillwater River Press).

The Biltmore welcomed both black and white guests during a time when racial discrimination in public accommodations was common. Starting in 1941, the hotel paid for a listing in The Negro Motorist Green Book, a travel guide for Black travelers.

The Biltmore was bought by Sheraton Hotels in 1947 and renamed the Sheraton-Biltmore Hotel. Providence was flooded by Hurricane Carol in 1954, and much of the lobby of the Sheraton-Biltmore was underwater; a plaque commemorates the high water mark today, eight feet up on lobby columns. Sheraton sold the hotel, along with seventeen other aging properties, to Gotham Hotels in 1968 and it became the Biltmore Hotel & Motor Inn.

Restoration
In 1975, amidst a flurry of lawsuits pertaining to tens of thousands of dollars of unpaid utility bills and back taxes, Gotham Hotels was forced to close the Biltmore. It remained vacant for four years. At one point, with the hotel facing demolition; Mayor Buddy Cianci helped with efforts to designate the hotel a landmark and assembled a group of local businessmen, including Bruce Sundlun of the Outlet Company, Michael Metcalf of The Providence Journal, G. William Miller of Textron, and Jim Winoker and Dominic Zinni of B.B. Greenberg Company, who purchased the hotel and implemented Federal tax credits to rehabilitate the building, reopening it in 1979 as the Biltmore Plaza Hotel. The Biltmore's external glass elevator was added during this rehabilitation, and served all 18 floors of the hotel (though it no longer runs). In 1983, the owners retained Dunfey Hotels to manage the property, and it was renamed Biltmore Plaza, A Dunfey Hotel. Soon after, Dunfey's owner, Aer Lingus, purchased the Omni Hotels chain, and the hotel was renamed the Omni Biltmore Hotel. By the 1990s, the Omni Biltmore was fully owned by The Providence Journal. They sold the hotel to the Grand Heritage Hotels chain in July 1995 for $7 million, and it was renamed the Providence Biltmore. The hotel was sold out of receivership on May 31, 2012 to Finard Coventry Hotel Management, for $16 million. Finard Coventry invested a further $10 million in renovations, and the hotel joined Curio - A Collection by Hilton, on December 16, 2014.

Graduate Providence

In October 2017, the Biltmore was sold to AJ Capital Partners, a Chicago-based hotel and real estate firm, for $43.6 million. The hotel was renovated and renamed Graduate Providence on April 2, 2019, as part of AJ Capital's boutique chain of "Graduate" hotels, in college towns across the United States. The new owners have retained the hotel's iconic neon "Biltmore" sign.

Description
The hotel was originally built with 600 rooms; later, walls were knocked down and suites were created. It now offers 292 guest rooms.

The rooftop level Grand Ballroom offers expansive views of the city and Kennedy Plaza and can hold up to 750 guests; its event space is designed for functions such as wedding receptions, banquet service, and conferences.

It was the tallest and largest hotel in Providence for 71 years, until The Westin Providence (today known as the Omni Providence Hotel) was completed in 1993. The hotel was home to the largest Starbucks in New England from 2003-2019.

In popular culture

Cinema backdrop
The Providence Biltmore features prominently in the 2004 Jeff Nathanson film The Last Shot, and the 2007 Anne Fletcher film 27 Dresses.

Showtime episodes of Brotherhood from 2004 to 2007 were also shot here.

Literature
In 2022, author Amanda Quay Blount published a book about the hotel’s first 100 years entitled “Meet Me At The Biltmore”, through Stillwater River Press. The book chronicles the hotel’s storied past alongside Providence’s highs and lows throughout the 20th century. 

The Hotel is the scene of a Brown University collegiate reunion in The Devil Wears Prada'' by Lauren Weisberger.

Television
The Providence Hotel is shown as a scene is NOS4A2, The Hourglass (S2, E6), series on AMC. Air Date: 7/26/2020

See also
National Register of Historic Places listings in Providence, Rhode Island

Gallery

References

External links 
 Graduate Providence official website
 
 ”Meet Me At The Biltmore: 100 Years at Providences Most Storied Hotel”. Www.Biltmorebook.com 

Bowman-Biltmore Hotels
Skyscrapers in Providence, Rhode Island
Hotel buildings completed in 1922
Skyscraper hotels in Rhode Island
Hotels established in 1922
Warren and Wetmore buildings
Hotel buildings on the National Register of Historic Places in Rhode Island
National Register of Historic Places in Providence, Rhode Island
Historic district contributing properties in Rhode Island
Sheraton hotels
1922 establishments in Rhode Island